Voćin is a village and municipality in western Slavonia, Croatia, located southwest of Slatina and east of Daruvar. The population of the municipality is 1,911, with 956 people living in Voćin itself (census 2021).

Geography
Voćin, a pilgrimage site, is located in a valley of the Voćinska Rijeka at the foot of Papuk Mountain. The surrounding area is notable for the Lisičine arboretum, the special Sekulinačke Planine forest vegetation reserve.

History

In the late 19th and early 20th century, Voćin was part of the Virovitica County of the Kingdom of Croatia-Slavonia. The church was destroyed during World War II and rebuilt in 1973.

During the World War II, on January 14, 1942, happened the first Voćin massacre - killing of 350 Serb civilians by the Croatian Ustaše. The massacre was carried out as retaliation for partisans' action in Papuk.

During the Croatian War of Independence, the village's was the site of a massacre by the Serb White Eagles, who killed 43 villagers, all but one of whom were ethnic Croats. A Serb civilian who tried to protect his neighbors was the other fatality. Overnight, between 13 and 14 December 1991, the village's 550-year-old late style gothic church of the Visitation of the Blessed Virgin Mary was destroyed by explosive charges.

Demographics
According to the 2021 census, the Voćin municipality had 1,911 inhabitants. The municipality consists of the following settlements:

Population of the Voćin municipality by ethnicity:

Population of the Voćin village by ethnicity:

See also
Voćin massacre
Voćin massacre WW2 on 14 January 1942
Church of the Visitation of the Blessed Virgin Mary, Voćin

References

External links

Voćin, commune of Voćin

Municipalities of Croatia
Populated places in Virovitica-Podravina County
Slavonia
Serb communities in Croatia